The Magic Soup and the Bittersweet Faces is the debut studio album by Norwegian hip hop duo Envy, and the only album released under that name (as they later changed their name to "Nico & Vinz"). It was released in Norway on April 27, 2012. The album has peaked to number 37 on the Norwegian Albums Chart. The album includes the single "One Song".

Singles
 "One Song" was released as the lead single from the album on June 10, 2011. The song has peaked to number 19 on the Norwegian Singles Chart.
 ""Go Loud" as released as the second and last single which came out in 2012 from the album The Magic Soup and the Bittersweet Faces.

Track listing

Chart performance

Weekly charts

Release history

References

2012 debut albums
Nico & Vinz albums
European Border Breakers Award-winning albums